The Chinese Ambassador to Colombia is the official representative of the People's Republic of China to Colombia.

List of representatives

See also
China–Colombia relations

References 

Ambassadors of China to Colombia
Colombia
China